The Japan Central Federation of National Public Service Employees' Unions (Kokko Soren) was a trade union representing civil servants in Japan.

The union's origins lay in the Japan Federation of National Public Service Employees' Unions (Kokko Roren), an affiliate of the General Council of Trade Unions of Japan (Sohyo).  In 1989, Sohyo merged in to the new Japanese Trade Union Confederation (RENGO), but only a minority of Kokko Roren's sectoral unions wished to join RENGO.  Those which did established a new federation, Kokko Soren.  On formation, it had 44,109 members, while in 1996 its membership was 43,697.  In 2001, it joined the new Japan Public Sector Union (Kokko Rengo), but initially retained a separate identity.  However, in 2011, it decided to dissolve, and its own affiliates became direct affiliates of Kokko Rengo.

The union's affiliates were:

 All Finance Bureau Labour Union
 All Hokkaido Development Bureau Employees' Union
 Japan Agriculture and Forestry Ministry Workers' Unions
 Okinawa Public Service Workers' Union

There was also an affiliate representing treasury workers.

References

Public sector trade unions
Trade unions established in 1989
Trade unions disestablished in 2011